The Missouri Pacific Depot in Earle, Arkansas, is located south of Main Street and west of Commerce Street, on the north side of the Missouri-Pacific Railroad tracks in the center of town.  Completed in 1922, this brick single-story depot exhibits architectural features common to those built by the railroad in that period, with extended eaves supported by large brackets.  The station was designed to support passenger and small freight traffic, and served the railroad until 1969.

The depot was listed on the National Register of Historic Places in 1986.

Crittenden County Museum
Since October 1987 the railroad depot houses the Crittenden County Museum. Exhibits of the museum include cotton farming, broom-making, early settlements and history of Crittenden County, schools and doctors. The art exhibit includes works by nationally acclaimed Arkansas Delta artist and Earle native son, Carroll Cloar.

See also
National Register of Historic Places listings in Crittenden County, Arkansas

References

External links
Crittenden County Museum

Railway stations on the National Register of Historic Places in Arkansas
Railway stations in the United States opened in 1922
Transportation in Crittenden County, Arkansas
National Register of Historic Places in Crittenden County, Arkansas
Earle
Railway stations closed in 1969
Former railway stations in Arkansas